The 1997 McNeese State Cowboys football team was an American football team that represented McNeese State University as a member of the Southland Conference (Southland) during the 1997 NCAA Division I-AA football season. In their eighth year under head coach Bobby Keasler, the team compiled an overall record of 13–2, with a mark of 6–1 in conference play, and finished as Southland co-champions. The Cowboys advanced to the Division I-AA playoffs and lost to Youngstown State in the championship game.

Schedule

References

McNeese State
McNeese Cowboys football seasons
Southland Conference football champion seasons
McNeese State Cowboys football